The Kingfisher class was a class of nine patrol sloops of the British Royal Navy built in three groups of three each during the 1930s, that saw service during World War II, mainly on East Coast convoys in the North Sea.

Design 
The Kingfisher class was an attempt to build a patrol vessel under 600 tons, due to the lack of clauses on vessels this size in the London Naval Treaty of 1930. It was intended it would escort coastal shipping in wartime. Its small size and the resultant short range that this entailed (it was based on a scaled-down destroyer) rendered it unsuitable for open ocean work.

The design had a number of shortcomings: firstly, it was designed to too high a standard; constructed to full naval warship specifications and powered by geared steam turbine engines, it was not suitable for mass production; and, it was armed with only a single 4-inch gun forward and depth charges aft, which severely limited their ability to defend themselves, let alone their charges.

Modifications 
The woeful lack of defensive armament was addressed early in the war by adding a multiple Vickers machine gun on the quarterdeck in the Kingfisher and Kittiwake groups, as per the Shearwaters. As they became available, two single 20 mm Oerlikon guns were added, on single pedestal mounts on the deckhouse aft, with the useless machine gun being replaced later with a further pair of such weapons. Centimetric Radar Type 271 was added on the roof of the bridge as it became available, this was a target indication set capable of picking up the conning tower or even the periscope or snorkel of a submarine. Radar Type 286 air warning was added at the masthead. The ships that had the Mark V gun on the open mounting HA Mark III had a shield added to give the gun crews a measure of protection on the exposed fo'c'sle.

Ships

Kingfisher group 

  — built by Fairfield Shipbuilding and Engineering Company, Govan. Ordered 15 December 1933, keel laid down 1 June 1934, launched 14 February 1935, and completed 18 June 1935. Sold for scrapping 1947.
  — built by Alexander Stephen and Sons, Linthouse. Ordered 21 March 1935, keel laid down 12 June 1935, launched 26 March 1936, and completed 15 July 1936. Sold for scrapping 1947.
  — also built by Alexander Stephen and Sons, Linthouse. Ordered 21 March 1935, keel laid down 12 June 1935, launched 5 May 1936, and completed 26 August 1936. Rammed and damaged by German midget submarine in North Sea 26 March 1945 and written off as constructive total loss, sold for scrapping 1947.

Kittiwake group 

  — built by John I. Thornycroft and Company, Woolston. Ordered on 21 January 1936, keel laid down 7 April 1936, launched 30 November 1936, and completed 29 April 1937. Sold into mercantile service 1946 as Tuch Shing.
  — also built by John I. Thornycroft and Company, Woolston. Ordered on 21 January 1936, keel laid down 21 April 1936, launched 28 January 1937, and completed 1 July 1937. Sold into mercantile service 1946 as Tuch Loon.
  — built by Yarrow and Company, Scotstoun. Ordered on 13 January 1937, keel laid down 8 March 1937, launched 2 February 1938, and completed 16 June 1938. Sold for scrapping 1947. Widgeon also had pennant number P62.

Shearwater group 

  — also built by J. Samuel White and Company, Cowes; ordered 6 April 1938, keel laid down 15 August 1938, launched 18 April 1939, and completed 7 September 1939. Sold for scrapping 1947.
  — built by William Denny and Brothers, Dumbarton; ordered 6 April 1938, keel laid down 22 August 1938, launched 6 July 1939, and completed 28 October 1939. Sold for scrapping November 1950.
  — also built by J. Samuel White and Company, Cowes; ordered 6 April 1938, keel laid down 22 August 1938, launched 18 August 1939, and completed 28 November 1939. Mined in Humber estuary 10 June 1941.

In fiction 
Nicholas Monsarrat, the author of The Cruel Sea, served in two Kingfisher-class sloops: HMS Guillemot in 1942 as First Lieutenant, and HMS Shearwater in 1943 as Captain, after they had been reclassified as corvettes.   HMS Dipper and HMS Winger were the fictional names he gave to these Kingfisher class corvettes in his stories East Coast Corvette (1943) and Corvette Command (1944), written during the war when security included ship's names.

Bibliography 

 

 
 

 
Sloop classes